Utirik Atoll or Utrik Atoll (Marshallese:) is a coral atoll of 10 islands in the Pacific Ocean, and forms a legislative district of the Ratak Chain of the Marshall Islands.
The population of Utirik Atoll is 300-400 as of 2020. it is one of the northernmost Marshall Islands with permanent habitation.

The larger islets are:
 Utirik
 Aon
 Bikrak
 Pike
 Āllok
 Nalap

History
Historical artifacts have been unearthed on the Atoll which date back to ca. 380 C.E., including tools likely used by early Micronesian peoples. Its first recorded sighting was by the Spanish navigator Álvaro de Saavedra on board the ship Florida on 29 December 1527. Together with Rongelap, Ailinginae and Toke atolls, they were charted as Islas de los Reyes (Islands of the Three Wise Kings in Spanish) due to the proximity of Epiphany. Utirik Atoll was claimed by the Empire of Germany along with the rest of the Marshall Islands in 1884. After World War I, the island came under the South Seas Mandate of the Empire of Japan. Following the end of World War II, Utirik came under the control of the United States as part of the Trust Territory of the Pacific Islands. Utirik was one of four atolls affected by nuclear fallout from Castle Bravo, the largest of the many nuclear weapon tests conducted at Bikini Atoll immediately following World War II. Research is still being done to ascertain the radiation levels, though many scientists agree that there is no harmful effect from the radiation still present. The island has been part of the independent Republic of the Marshall Islands since 1986.

Education
Marshall Islands Public School System operates Utrik Elementary School. Northern Islands High School on Wotje serves the community.

Temperature record

See also
 Also contaminated by Castle Bravo test: Rongelap Atoll, Ailinginae Atoll, Rongerik Atoll

References

External links

Marshall Islands site

Video: Glimpse of Utrik Atoll

Atolls of the Marshall Islands
Ratak Chain
Municipalities of the Marshall Islands